Pasquia Hills are hills in the Canadian province of Saskatchewan. They are located in the east central part of the province in the RM of Hudson Bay No. 394 near the Manitoba border. The hills are the northern most in a series of hills called the Manitoba Escarpment. The Manitoba Escarpment marks the western edge of the pre-historical glacial Lake Agassiz. The other four hills include Porcupine Hills, Duck Mountain, and Riding Mountain.

There are three main watersheds that flow from Pasquia Hills, all of which are part of the Hudson Bay drainage basin. The rivers flowing from the north side meet the Saskatchewan River, which eventually works its way into Lake Winnipeg. The Overflowing River starts at Overflow Lake in the hills and travels east into Manitoba where it flows into Overflow Bay in Lake Winnipegosis. On the south side, the rivers drain into Red Deer River, which flows into Dawson Bay of Lake Winnipegosis.

Parks and recreation 
There are several parks located on the Pasquia Hills, including a provincial park, recreation sites, and regional parks. At the heart of the hills is Wildcat Hill Provincial Park, which is a wilderness park with no services that covers 22,000 hectares. Wildcat Hill, at 784 metres above sea level, is near the centre of the provincial park. Other parks include Mountain Cabin Recreation Site, Pasquia Regional Park, Pasquia River Recreation Site, Pasquia Hills North Recreation Site, Overflowing Recreation Site, Fir River Road Recreation Site, and Ruby Lake Recreation Site.

Pasquia Provincial Forest 
The Pasquia Provincial Forest is the forest that encompasses the Pasquia Hills and it is part of the Northern Boreal Forest in a sub region called Mid-Boreal Upland. It is one of several provincial forests in Saskatchewan. Recreation and logging are very important industries in the region. The forests of Wildcat Hill Provincial Park were originally protected in 1971 as a forest reserve and in 1992, it became a provincial park.

The trees of the Pasquia forest are typical of the Mid-Boreal Upland consisting of mixed coniferous and deciduous. The trees are medium to tall, closed stands of trembling aspen and balsam poplar, white and black spruce, and balsam fir. There are 21 different orchid species in the forest, including the rare Ram's Head Lady Slipper.

Wildlife in and around the forest include elk, white tail deer, moose, bears, muskrats, beavers, woodland caribou, and cougars. There are over 350 bird species in the forest.

See also 
List of protected areas of Saskatchewan
Porcupine Provincial Forest
List of Saskatchewan provincial forests
Geography of Saskatchewan

References 

Hills of Saskatchewan
Landforms of Saskatchewan
Forests of Saskatchewan